The fifth series of Bad Girls was broadcast on ITV from 8 May 2003 and concluded on 21 August 2003, it was the third and final series to feature 16 episodes.

Storylines
It is discovered Shaz Wiley died during the fire cliffhanger of series 4, her girlfriend Denny Blood (Alicya Eyo) is determined to get revenge on Snowball Merriman (Nicole Faraday) for setting off the bomb. Escapee Shell Dockley (Debra Stephenson) is found in Amsterdam by Jim Fenner (Jack Ellis) and other male officers from Larkhall.

Heavily pregnant, Shell is returned to Larkhall, where she is reunited with Denny. Shell tricks Snowball into thinking they can be friends and she can give her a makeover, which results in Denny and Shell setting Snowball's hair on fire, and they both begin bullying her. Fenner pimps Shell by offering her money to give the male officers a handjob. After the baby's birth, officer Colin Hedges tries to force her to have sex, when she violently refuses, Fenner makes it seem as if she tried to smother her baby. Shell is carted of to a mental home and her baby is taken into care.

Things go from bad to worse for Snowball, with the prisoners refusing to forgive her, constantly heckling, taunting and insulting her at every opportunity and giving her raw food to eat. Snowball tries numerous escape tactics all with disastrous consequences, first she accidentally shoots her boyfriend Richie Atkins, resulting in him becoming paralysed, they later have a suicide pact which goes wrong, resulting in Richie dying, but not Snowball. Richie's mother Yvonne Atkins (Linda Henry) who hates Snowball later helps her commit suicide.

Sylvia Hollamby's (Helen Fraser) husband Bobby commits suicide leaving her in financial debt. New prisoners The "Costa Cons", Bev Tull (Amanda Barrie) and Phyl Oswyn (Stephanie Beacham) arrive and after convincing Denny they can contact Shaz' spirit, Hollamby falls for it and gets them to contact her late husband. Babs Hunt (Isabelle Amyes) marries the former prison chaplain, Henry Mills – bad news for Sylvia, who had set her sights on Henry after she was widowed when her husband Bobby committed suicide.

The ongoing feud between Fenner and Wing Governor Karen Betts (Claire King) reaches its climax as Fenner ruthlessly frames Karen for a hit-and-run accident in which a man dies. Neil Grayling divorces Di, and comes out as gay, also giving Di the job of wing governor, as long as she carries his baby, which she has actually aborted. Di and Fenner grow close.

Julie Saunders is diagnosed with breast cancer and takes the decision to take her chances without chemotherapy treatment. This causes a rift between the two Julies and their new friend Julie O'Kane (Victoria Bush) who decides to change her name again, this time to Tina O'Kane.

New prison officer Selena Geeson (Charlotte Lucas) and new inmate Kris Yates (Jennifer Ness) are in a relationship. Kris is taking the rap for killing her abusive father in order to spare her younger sister, the real culprit. Fenner's nefarious ways continue when he kills Yvonne as she tries to escape Larkhall, by ensuring that she will be trapped in the "hanging cell", a small room beneath the main prison that is blocked off from the outside world.

The final episode sees the last appearances for Denny, Yvonne, Barbara and Buki.

Cast

Main cast

Special guest
 Debra Stephenson as Shell Dockley
 Christopher Biggins as himself

Recurring and guest cast
Recurring cast:

 Alex King as Ritchie Atkins
 Michael Elwyn as Rev. Henry Mills
 Philip McGough as Dr. Malcolm Nicholson
 Maria Charles as Noreen Biggs
 Geoffrey Hutchings as Bobby Hollamby
 Danielle King as Lauren Atkins
 Paul Brennen as Eric Bostock
 Jamie King as Tony
 Nikki Amuka-Bird as Officer Paula Miles
 Eugene Walker as Officer Blakeson
 Holly Palmer as Milly Yates

Guest cast:

 Martina Berne as Marieke
 Natasha O'Neal as Nightclub dancer
 Zoe-Anne Phillips as Nightclub dancer
 Petia Pavlova as Prison Inmate
 Gregory Floy as Mr. Pugh
 Jochum ten Haaf as Dutch Police Sergeant
 Jo Cowen as Terri
 Frances Jeater as Mrs. Derbyshire
 Mark Laurie as PO Potter
 Adam Christopher as PO Jenkins
 John O'Mahony as Duty Medical officer
 Kate Terence as Nurse
 Gordon Cameron as Policeman
 Graham Kent as Stan Harvey
 Andy Rashleigh as Doug McBain
 Myles Senior Campbell as Lennox
 Timothy Davies as Vicar
 Ash Varrez as Dr. Khan
 Lynn Farleigh as Mrs. Williams
 Biddy Wells as Sandra Bradford
 Don Gallagher as DI Armitage
 Steven Cree as Waiter
 Robert Hudson as PO McArthur
 Ruth Platt as Lucy Kerridge
 Eamon Geoghegan as DS Rivers
 Simon Williams as Oliver Lilley
 Garfield Morgan as Clive Mills
 Elaine Claxton as Reverend Buxton

Episodes 
Series 5 was broadcast on Thursdays at 9:00pm.

Reception

Ratings

Awards and nominations
 Inside Soap Awards (2003) – Best Drama (Won)
 National Television Awards (2003) – Most Popular Drama (Nominated)
 TV Quick Awards (2003) – Best Actress (Claire King – Won)
 TV Quick Awards (2003) – Best Loved Drama (Won)

References

External links
 
 List of Bad Girls episodes at Epguides

05
2003 British television seasons